Noël Martin Joseph Necker (25 December 1730 – 30 December 1793) was a Belgian physician and botanist.

Career 
Necker was the personal physician to the court of the Electoral Palatinate in Mannheim. His botanical was work involved the study of mosses (Bryophyta) on which he wrote several works, and fungi on which he wrote the Traité sur la mycitologie. He is also known for describing the orchid genus Dactylorhiza.

Eponyms 
The moss genus Neckera, and its family, the Neckeraceae were named in his honour.

Publications 
 Deliciae gallobelgicae silvestres, seu Tractatus generalis plantarum gallo-belgicarum. 2 vols. 1768
 Methodus Muscorum per Clases, Ordines, Genera (Juniperus dilatata & Juniperus sabina var. tamariscifolia) Necker, Noël Joseph de. Mannheim. 1771
 Physiologia muscorum, per examen analytic Necker, Noël Joseph de. 1774
 Traité sur la mycitologie ou Discours sur les champignons en général… 1774
 Phytozoologie philosophique, dans laquelle on démontre comment le nombre des genres & des especes, concernant les animaux & les vegetaux, a été limité & fixé par la nature. Necker, Noël Joseph de, Societatem Typographycam. 1790
 Corollarum ad Philos, botanicam Linnaei spectans Necker, Noël Joseph de, Neowedae ad Rhenum apud Societaten Typographycam. 1790
 Elementa botanica, genera genuina, species naturales omnium . . . Necker, Noël Joseph de, Societatem Typographycam. 1790

See also
 :Category:Taxa named by Noël Martin Joseph de Necker

References 

Scientists of the Austrian Netherlands
1730 births
1793 deaths
18th-century German physicians
18th-century botanists